Charley's Aunt is a farce by Brandon Thomas.

Charley's Aunt may also refer to:

Films
 Charley's Aunt (1911 film), a silent Italian film
 Charley's Aunt (1915 film), a silent American film
 Charley's Aunt (1925 film), a silent American film
 Charleys tant, a 1926 silent Swedish film
 Charley's Aunt (1930 film), an American film
 Charley's Aunt (1934 film), a German film
 Charley's (Big-Hearted) Aunt, a 1940 British film
 Charley's Aunt (1941 film), a 1941 American film
 Charley's Aunt (1943 film), a 1943 Italian film
 Where's Charley?, a 1952 British film
 Charley's Aunt (1956 film), a German film
 Charles' Aunt, a 1959 Danish film
 Charley's Aunt (1963 film), an Austrian film